Dragan Dimitrovski (born 26 July 1977 in Bitola, Yugoslavia) is a retired Macedonian footballer who last played as a forward for FK Pelister in the Macedonian First League. He has also played for the Macedonian national team.

Club career
In 2009, while playing for Pelister, he scored his 100th league goal in a 3–0 win over Metalurg becoming only the third player to reach 100 league goals in Macedonia. After the match, he would say "I expected to score the 100th goal but not the gift from Čkembari. I promise more goals in the future and trust me, you have not heard the last word from this young team. We won the match easier than expected congrats to all our footballers."

International career 
He made his senior debut for Macedonia in a December 2001 friendly match away against Oman and has earned a total of 14 caps, scoring 2 goals. His final international was an August 2004 FIFA World Cup qualification match against Armenia.

Honours

Pelister
 Macedonian Cup: 2000–01
 Macedonian Second League: 2005–06, 2011–12

Pobeda
 Macedonian First League: 2003–04
-the best player in the Macedonian Football League 2003
-top scorer in the Macedonian Football League 2004 with 26 goals

11 Oktomvri
 Macedonian Second League: 2010-11

References

External links
Profile at MacedonianFootball 

1977 births
Living people
Sportspeople from Bitola
Association football forwards
Macedonian footballers
North Macedonia international footballers
FK Tikvesh players
FK Pelister players
FK Pobeda players
Macedonian First Football League players
Macedonian Second Football League players